ACA–KDCA Cricket Ground (or Andhra Cricket Association–Krishna District Cricket Association Ground) is the common name for series of two cricket grounds located in the Indian state of Andhra Pradesh. It is located in the village of Mulapadu of Krishna district, near Vijayawada. It is under the jurisdiction of Andhra Cricket Association and owned by Krishna District Cricket Association (ACA–KDCA).

Anurag Thakur has inaugurated the stadium on 30 May 2016. The southern ground was  named as Chukkapalli Pitchaiah ground and the northern one as Devineni Venkata Ramana-Praneetha ground, which were officially inaugurated on 10 November 2016 by the Chief Minister of Andhra Pradesh, N. Chandrababu Naidu.

Tournaments 
On 10 November 2016, the stadium has hosted a series of international matches played between India women and West Indies women cricket teams, a part of 2014–16 ICC Women's Championship tournament.

Regional tournaments 
It has earlier conducted tournaments such as, KDCA Power League Trophy and Future Cup tournaments on the two grounds of the KDCA at Mulapadu.

References 

Cricket grounds in Andhra Pradesh
2016 establishments in Andhra Pradesh
Buildings and structures in Krishna district
Sports venues completed in 2016